The 1942–43 NCAA men's basketball season began in December 1942, progressed through the regular season and conference tournaments, and concluded with the 1943 NCAA basketball tournament championship game on March 30, 1943, at Madison Square Garden in New York, New York. The Wyoming Cowboys won their first NCAA national championship with a 46–34 victory over the Georgetown Hoyas.

Rule changes 

In overtime, a player can commit a fifth foul before fouling out. Previously, a player fouled out after committing four fouls, regardless of whether the game went into overtime or not.

Season headlines 
 In February 1943, the Helms Athletic Foundation retroactively selected its national champions for the seasons from 1919–20 through 1941–42. Beginning with the 1942–43 season, it began to pick each season's national champion annually, a practice it continued through the 1981–82 season.
 Top-ranked Illinois declined to participate in either the NCAA tournament or the National Invitation Tournament after three of its starters were drafted into the United States Army for World War II service.
 The 1943 NCAA Tournament championship game between Wyoming and Georgetown was the only one in history not filmed for posterity. It had a smaller crowd than expected because of the greater local interest in New York City in the championship run St. John's made in the 1943 National Invitation Tournament. Until at least the mid-1950s, the NIT was the more prestigious of the two tournaments.
 As a fundraiser for the American Red Cross, the finalists and semifinalists of the NCAA Tournament and NIT took part in the Sportswriters Invitational Playoff, in which the two tournament champions, Wyoming (NCAA) and St. John's (NIT), and the two runners-up, Georgetown (NCAA) and Toledo (NIT), played each other at Madison Square Garden after their tournaments ended, with the games counting in the teams' records for the season. The NCAA Tournament teams prevailed in both games: Wyoming beat St. John's 52–47 with 18,000 fans in attendance, and the Hoyas defeated Toledo 54–40 to close out the season. The post-tournament benefit games — touted as the "mythical national championship" between the two tournament winners — would be played again in each of the next two seasons.
 In 1995, the Premo-Porretta Power Poll retroactively selected Illinois as its national champion for the 1942–43 season.

Conference membership changes

Regular season

Conference winners and tournaments

Statistical leaders

Post-season tournaments

NCAA tournament

Semifinals and finals

National Invitation tournament

Semifinals and finals 

 Third Place – Washington & Jefferson 39, Fordham 34

Awards

Consensus All-American teams

Major player of the year awards 

 Helms Player of the Year: George Senesky, Saint Joseph's (retroactive selection in 1944)
Sporting News Player of the Year: Andy Phillip, Illinois

Other major awards 

 NIT/Haggerty Award (Top player in New York City metro area): Andrew Levane, St. John's

Coaching changes 

A number of teams changed coaches during the season and after it ended.

References